James Gatwich Kone (born 28 November 1987), also spelt Kon, is a South Sudanese footballer who plays as a striker, who played for the South Sudan national football team in 2012.

Early life
James Gatwich Kone was born on 28 November 1987 in Malakal, South Sudan.

Club career
From 2012 to 2014, Kone played for Nasir FC Juba, moving to Al-Malakia Juba from 2015 to 2016. He then played for Al-Salam Wau (2017); Kator FC Juba (2018); and Amarat United (2019).

International career
He has made two senior appearances for South Sudan, against Ethiopia and Kenya in the 2012 CECAFA Cup.

References

Living people
South Sudanese footballers
South Sudan international footballers
Association football forwards
1987 births